The 1960–61 Luxembourg National Division was the 47th season of top level association football in Luxembourg.

Overview
It was performed in 12 teams, and CA Spora Luxembourg won the championship.

League standings

Results

References
Luxembourg - List of final tables (RSSSF)

Luxembourg National Division seasons
Lux
Nat